Makati Sky Plaza is a 23-storey high-rise office building in Makati, Metro Manila, Philippines. It is located along Ayala Avenue in the Makati CBD and was completed in 1999. The building's primary tenants include the Philippine headquarters of Standard Chartered Bank, Japan Airlines, and The Bank of Tokyo-Mitsubishi UFJ.

References

External links
 Makati Sky Plaza at Emporis

Skyscrapers in Makati
Skyscraper office buildings in Metro Manila
Office buildings completed in 1999
1999 establishments in the Philippines
20th-century architecture in the Philippines